The Statue of the Tiber river with Romulus and Remus is a large statue from ancient Rome exhibited at the Louvre museum in Paris, France. It is an allegory of the Tiber river that waters the city of Rome.

Description 
The Tiber is depicted as a middle-aged man, bearded and reclining, according to the typical pattern for representations of river  gods. In his hands, he holds the attributes that signify the benefits he bestows on Rome:
 In his left hand, an oar represents navigation;
 In his right hand, a cornucopia represents the nourishing virtues of the river.

Under the right arm of the god lies the she-wolf which, according to legend, suckled the twins Romulus and Remus who had been abandoned in the Tiber and would later go on to found the city of Rome.

The base of the statue is decorated with reliefs depicting a scene of grazed fields, one of boatmen, and another relating to the tale of Aeneas.

The statue is 3.17 m wide, 2.22 m tall, and 1.31 m deep. It is carved from marble taken from Mount Pentelicus near Athens, Greece.

Location 

The statue was discovered in 1512 in Rome at the site of the Temple of Isis and Serapis, near the present-day basilica of Santa Maria sopra Minerva. The statue undoubtedly decorated a fountain situated on the path leading to the sanctuary. It mirrored a statue of the Nile river (now preserved in the Vatican) in which Romulus and Remus are replaced by a crowd of children representing pygmies.

History 

After their discovery, the two statues were initially preserved in the papal collections. Following the Treaty of Tolentino (1797) between the French Republic and the Papal States, they were transferred to the Louvre, where their presence was attested in 1811. In 1815, after the defeat of Napoleon, the statue of the Nile was returned to the Vatican. However, the statue of the Tiber was offered by the pope Pius VII to the French king Louis XVIII and remained in the Louvre.

The image of the statue of the Tiber was widely circulated and it became the subject of numerous marble or bronze replicas.

Dating 
The date of the sculpture is uncertain. It was probably installed after the fire at the Temple of Isis in 80 CE. But it could be from the later Hadrian period (117–138 CE).

See also 
 Temple of Isis and Serapis

References

Bibliography 
J. Le Gall, « Les Bas-reliefs de la statue du Tibre », in Revue archéologique, 1944.

External links 

  https://sites.google.com/a/tools.memorialplayers.org/chamberofwonders/heemskerck/25
article in louvre collection 

1st-century BC sculptures
Tiber
1512 archaeological discoveries
Antiquities acquired by Napoleon
Archaeological discoveries in Italy
Hellenistic-style Roman sculptures
Allegorical sculptures in France
Marble sculptures in France
Sculptures of men in France
Ancient Greek and Roman sculptures of the Louvre
Cultural depictions of Romulus and Remus
Personifications of rivers